This is a list of high schools in San Diego County, California. It includes public and private schools and is arranged by school district (public schools) or affiliation (private schools).  These schools offer grades 9 through 12.  Junior High schools are not listed here.

Public schools

Warner Springs Unified School District

 Warner High School, Warner Springs

Borrego Springs Unified School District

Borrego Springs High School, Borrego Springs
Palm Canyon High School (continuation), Borrego Springs

Carlsbad Unified School District

Carlsbad High School, Carlsbad
Carlsbad Village Academy 10-12, Carlsbad
Sage Creek High School, Carlsbad, Carlsbad

Coronado Unified School District

Coronado High School, Coronado
Palm Academy for Learning, Coronado

Escondido Union School District

Diego Valley Charter High School, Escondido
Center City High School, Escondido	
Escondido Charter High School, Escondido
Escondido High School, Escondido
Orange Glen High School, Escondido
San Pasqual High School, Escondido
Valley High School (continuation), Escondido
Classical Academy High School, Escondido
Del Lago Academy, Escondido

Fallbrook Union High School District

Fallbrook Union High School, Fallbrook	
Ivy High School (continuation), Fallbrook
Oasis High School (alternative), Fallbrook

Grossmont Union High School District

Diego Valley Charter High School, El Cajon
Chaparral High School (continuation), El Cajon
El Cajon Valley High School, El Cajon
El Capitan High School, Lakeside
Granite Hills High School, El Cajon
Grossmont High School, La Mesa/El Cajon
Grossmont Middle College High School, El Cajon
Helix High School, La Mesa (independent charter high school, authorized by the Grossmont Union HS District)
Monte Vista High School, Spring Valley
Mount Miguel High School, Spring Valley
Santana High School, Santee
Steele Canyon High School, Spring Valley (independent charter high school, authorized by the Grossmont Union HS District)
Valhalla High School, El Cajon
West Hills High School, Santee

Julian Union High School District

Julian High School, Julian

Mountain Empire Unified School District

Mountain Empire High School, Pine Valley

Oceanside Unified School District

Diego Valley Charter High School, Oceanside
El Camino High School, Oceanside
Oceanside High School, Oceanside
Pacific View Charter School, Oceanside

Poway Unified School District

Abraxas High School, Poway
Del Norte High School, San Diego
Mount Carmel High School, San Diego
Poway High School, Poway
Rancho Bernardo High School, San Diego
Westview High School, San Diego

Ramona City Unified School District

Montecito High School (alternative), Ramona
Mountain Valley Academy High School, Ramona
Ramona High School, Ramona

San Diego County Office of Education
Monarch School, San Diego

San Diego Unified School District

San Dieguito Union High School District

Canyon Crest Academy, San Diego
La Costa Canyon High School, Carlsbad
North Coast High School (alternative), Encinitas
San Dieguito Academy, Encinitas
Sunset High School (alternative), Encinitas
Torrey Pines High School, San Diego

San Marcos Unified School District

Bayshore Prep Charter School, San Marcos	
Foothills High (alternative), San Marcos	
Mission Hills High School, San Marcos
San Marcos High School, San Marcos
Twin Oaks High School (continuation), San Marcos

Sweetwater Union High School District

Bonita Vista High School, Chula Vista
Castle Park High School, Chula Vista
Chula Vista High School, Chula Vista
Eastlake High School, Chula Vista
Hilltop High School, Chula Vista
MAAC Community Charter School, Chula Vista
Mar Vista High School, Imperial Beach
Montgomery High School, San Diego
Olympian High School, Chula Vista
Options Secondary School, Chula Vista
Otay Ranch High School, Chula Vista
Palomar High School, Chula Vista
San Ysidro High School, San Diego
Southwest High School, San Diego
Sweetwater High School, National City
East Hills Academy

Valley Center-Pauma Unified School District

Oak Glen High School (continuation), Valley Center
Valley Center Adult Education, Valley Center
Valley Center High School, Valley Center
Valley Center Independent Study, Valley Center

Vista Unified School District

Diego Valley Charter High School, Vista
Guajome Park Academy (charter), Vista
Mission Vista High School, Oceanside
North County Trade Tech High School (charter), Vista
Rancho Buena Vista High School, Vista
Vista High School, Vista

Warner Unified School District

San Jose Valley Continuation High School, Warner Springs
Warner Middle / High School, Warner Springs

Private schools

Baptist
Ocean View Christian Academy

Catholic
Academy of Our Lady of Peace
Saint Augustine High School
Mater Dei Catholic High School
Cathedral Catholic High School

Episcopal
The Bishop's School, La Jolla

Jewish
San Diego Jewish Academy, San Diego
Southern California Yeshiva High School, San Diego
Torah High Schools of San Diego, San Diego

Lutheran
Victory Christian Academy, San Diego (formerly Lutheran High School of San Diego)

Seventh-Day Adventist
Escondido Adventist Academy, Escondido
San Diego Academy, National City

Non-Denominational
Army and Navy Academy, Carlsbad
Maranatha Christian Schools, San Diego
Calvin Christian School, Escondido
Santa Fe Christian Schools, Solana Beach
Horizon Christian Academy, San Diego
Horizon Prep School, Rancho Santa Fe
The Cambridge School, San Diego
Tri-City Christian School, Tri-City Christian School

Nonsectarian
The Child's Primary School, San Diego
Carlsbad Seaside Academy, Carlsbad	
Carlsbad Village Academy, Carlsbad
Francis W. Parker School, San Diego
Fusion Academy, Del Mar 
The Grauer School, Encinitas
High Bluff Academy, Rancho Santa Fe
Halstrom High School, San Diego
La Jolla Country Day School, La Jolla
Pacific Academy International, Encinitas
Pacific Ridge School, Carlsbad
San Diego French American School, La Jolla
The Waldorf School of San Diego High School, San Diego
Leeway Sudbury School, San Diego
High Bluff Academy, San Diego

Defunct schools
Day-McKellar Prep K-High School, La Mesa. Closed as of December, 2011 due to lack of funding.

See also
List of high schools in California
List of school districts in California
List of school districts in California by county
List of school districts in San Diego County, California
Primary and secondary schools in San Diego, California
List of closed secondary schools in California

References

External links
San Diego County Office of Education
San Diego County Schools, list of schools from SchoolTree.org

San Diego County
Schools high